The Treaty of Fort Wise of  1861 was a treaty entered into between the United States and six chiefs of the Southern Cheyenne and four of the Southern Arapaho Indian tribes. A significant proportion of Cheyennes opposed this treaty on the grounds that only a minority of Cheyenne chiefs had signed, and without the consent or approval of the rest of the tribe. Different responses to the treaty became a source of conflict between whites and Indians, leading to the Colorado War of 1864, including the Sand Creek Massacre.

Treaty of Fort Laramie (1851)

By the terms of the 1851 Treaty of Fort Laramie between the United States and various tribes including the Cheyenne and Arapaho, the Cheyenne and Arapaho were recognized to hold a vast territory encompassing the lands between the North Platte River and Arkansas River and eastward from the Rocky Mountains to western Kansas. This area included present-day southeastern Wyoming, southwestern Nebraska, most of eastern Colorado, and the westernmost portions of Kansas.  However, the discovery in November 1858 of gold in the Rocky Mountains in Colorado (then part of the western Kansas Territory) brought on a gold rush and a consequent flood of white emigration across Cheyenne and Arapaho lands. Colorado territorial officials pressured federal authorities to redefine the extent of Indians treaty lands, and in the fall of 1860 A.B. Greenwood, Commissioner of Indian Affairs, arrived at Bent's New Fort along the Arkansas River to negotiate a new treaty.

Treaty of Fort Wise (1861)
On February 18, 1861, six chiefs of the Southern Cheyenne and four of the Arapaho signed the Treaty of Fort Wise with the United States, at Bent's New Fort at Big Timbers near what is now Lamar, Colorado, recently leased by the U.S. Government and renamed Fort Wise, in which they ceded to the United States most of the lands designated to them by the Fort Laramie treaty.  The Cheyenne chiefs were Black Kettle, White Antelope, Lean Bear, Little Wolf, Tall Bear, and Left Hand; the Arapaho chiefs were Little Raven, Storm, Shave-Head, and Big Mouth.

The new reserve, less than one-thirteenth the size of the 1851 reserve, was located in eastern Colorado along the Arkansas River between the northern boundary of New Mexico and Sand Creek. Some bands of Cheyenne including the Dog Soldiers, a militaristic band of Cheyennes and Lakotas that had evolved beginning in the 1830s, were angry at those chiefs who had signed the treaty, disavowing the treaty and refusing to abide by its constraints. They continued to live and hunt in the bison-rich lands of eastern Colorado and western Kansas, becoming increasingly belligerent over the tide of white immigration across their lands, particularly in the Smoky Hill River country of Kansas, along which whites had opened a new trail to the gold fields. Cheyennes opposed to the treaty said that it had been signed by a small minority of the chiefs without the consent or approval of the rest of the tribe, that the signatories had not understood what they signed, and that they had been bribed to sign by a large distribution of gifts. The whites, however, claimed the treaty was a "solemn obligation" and considered that those Indians who refused to abide by it were hostile and planning a war.

Colorado War and Sand Creek Massacre

The beginning of the American Civil War in 1861 led to the organization of military forces in Colorado Territory. In March 1862, the Coloradans defeated the Texas Confederate Army in the Battle of Glorieta Pass in New Mexico. Following the battle, the First Regiment of Colorado Volunteers returned to Colorado Territory and were mounted as a home guard under the command of Colonel John Chivington. Chivington and Colorado territorial governor John Evans adopted a hard line against Indians. Continuing escalation led to the Colorado War of 1864–1865. On November 29, 1864, troops under Chivington attacked a peaceful Cheyenne and Arapaho camp at Sand Creek on the reserve established for them under the Treaty of Fort Wise. This event became known as the Sand Creek Massacre.

Footnotes

References
 Brown, Dee. (1970). Bury My Heart at Wounded Knee: An Indian History of the American West. Owl Books. .
 Greene, Jerome A. (2004). Washita, The Southern Cheyenne and the U.S. Army. Campaigns and Commanders Series, vol. 3. Norman, OK: University of Oklahoma Press. .
 Hoig, Stan. (1980). The Peace Chiefs of the Cheyennes. Norman, OK: University of Oklahoma Press. .
 Hyde, George E. (1968). Life of George Bent Written from His Letters. Ed. by Savoie Lottinville. Norman, OK: University of Oklahoma Press. .
 Michno, Gregory F. (2003). Encyclopedia of Indian Wars: Western Battles and Skirmishes 1850-1890. Missoula, MT: Mountain Press Publishing Company. .
 "Treaty of Fort Laramie with Sioux, Etc., 1851." 11 Stats. 749, Sept. 17, 1851. In Charles J. Kappler, compiler and editor, Indian Affairs: Laws and Treaties — Vol. II: Treaties. Washington, D.C.: Government Printing Office, 1904, pp. 594–596 . Through Oklahoma State University Library, Electronic Publishing Center.
 "Treaty with the Arapaho and Cheyenne, 1861" (Treaty of Fort Wise). 12 Stat. 1163, Feb. 15, 1861. Ratified Aug. 6, 1861; proclaimed Dec. 5, 1861.  In Charles J. Kappler, compiler and editor, Indian Affairs: Laws and Treaties — Vol. II: Treaties. Washington, D.C.: Government Printing Office, 1904, pp. 807–811 . Through Oklahoma State University Library, Electronic Publishing Center.

Cheyenne tribe
Fort Wise
1861 treaties
1861 in the United States